PC Express is a grocery click and collect & delivery service owned by Canadian retail conglomerate Loblaw Companies. The service began in October 2014 and the company now has over 700 pickup locations and delivers to ~70% of Canadian households. These locations include curbside pickup, self-serve kiosks, refrigerated vans, and Shoppers Drug Mart locations in urban areas. The Loblaw Companies banners participating in PC Express are Atlantic Superstore, Dominion, Fortinos, Loblaws, Maxi, No Frills, Provigo, Real Canadian Superstore, Valu-mart, Your Independent Grocer and Zehrs Markets. A service fee of $3 to $5 is added to each order, unless a customer has a PC Insiders subscription.

History 
Click and Collect at Loblaws stores began in fall 2014 with a product selection of around 20 thousand items, and had expanded to 60 active locations by June 2016. The first location had a drive-through; however, subsequent locations have used dedicated parking spots instead. By November 2015, the program had expanded to include Real Canadian Superstore locations in British Columbia. In December 2017, Loblaw Companies began offering click and collect in Atlantic Canada, starting with Halifax. By the start of 2018, about 300 stores were on the PC Express network, with plans to significantly expand the program to over 700 locations by year end. In February 2018, Loblaw Companies signed a partnership with Metrolinx to begin offering grocery pick-up at some GO Transit stations in the greater Toronto area. In November 2018, Loblaws began testing a self-checkout like feature in the PC Express mobile app at five of its Ontario stores, allowing customers to scan items as they shop and pay at the checkout.

See also 
 Instacart, the grocery delivery partner for Loblaw Companies banners
 joefresh.com, the e-commerce site of Loblaw Companies' fast fashion banner
 beauty.shoppersdrugmart.ca, the e-commerce site for Shoppers Drug Mart beauty products

References 

Express
Retail companies established in 2014
Online grocers